The 1933 AAA Championship Car season consisted of three races, beginning in Speedway, Indiana on May 30 and concluding in Syracuse, New York on September 9.  There was also one non-championship event.  The AAA National Champion and Indianapolis 500 winner was Louis Meyer.

Schedule and results

Leading National Championship standings

References

See also
 1933 Indianapolis 500

AAA Championship Car season
AAA Championship Car
1933 in American motorsport